Coalition of African American Pastors (CAAP) is an African-American civil rights and social-conservative non-profit organization. They advocate for religion in public life and against abortion and same-sex marriage.

Activity
 In July 2012, the group traveled to Houston, Texas in protest of the NAACP's decision to endorse same-sex marriage. Later the same year, they spoke out in opposition to Barack Obama for his support of same-sex marriage and issued a petition against same-sex marriage which garnered over 4,000 signers.
 On June 6, 2013 they condemned the Supreme Court's decision striking down the Defense of Marriage Act.
 February 2014, the group proposed impeaching Eric Holder for his support of same-sex marriage. Later the same year they announced the formation of RISE movement.
 February 2015, the group called for Justices Elena Kagan and Ruth Bader Ginsburg to recuse themselves from a case surrounding the state-level gay marriage bans.

See also

References

External links
CAAP Homepage

Nonpartisan organizations in the United States
Organizations based in Memphis, Tennessee